Barry Johnson (born 30 October 1947) is an Australian judoka. He competed in the men's half-heavyweight event at the 1972 Summer Olympics.

References

1947 births
Living people
Australian male judoka
Olympic judoka of Australia
Judoka at the 1972 Summer Olympics
Place of birth missing (living people)